Mikhail Dauhaliavets (born May 18, 1990 in Minsk, Belarusian SSR) is a Belarusian boxer. At the 2012 Summer Olympics, he competed in the Men's light heavyweight, but was defeated in the first round by Oleksandr Hvozdyk.  He also competed in the same weight division at the 2016 Summer Olympics.  He beat Valentino Manfredonia before losing to eventual silver medalist Adilbek Niyazymbetov.

References

External links
 
 
 
 

1990 births
Living people
Sportspeople from Minsk
Belarusian male boxers
Light-heavyweight boxers
Olympic boxers of Belarus
Boxers at the 2012 Summer Olympics
Boxers at the 2016 Summer Olympics
Universiade medalists in boxing
Universiade bronze medalists for Belarus
European Games competitors for Belarus
Boxers at the 2019 European Games
Medalists at the 2013 Summer Universiade
21st-century Belarusian people